Carmel Valley Airfield (also know as the Valley Vintage Airfield) was a privately owned airpark in Carmel Valley, California, from 1941 to 2002. The airport was later called the Carmel Valley Vintage Airfield. The California Historical Resources Commission voted to nominate the "Carmel Valley Vintage Airpark" (CVVA) as a  State Historic Resource. The Commission found that development of the airport was important as it represented the "first airpark in the United States and in the world."

History

In the 1930s, the property was used for growing oats by  bush pilots before the airport development. In 1940, Byington Ford and his brother, Tirey L. Ford Jr., developed the airport for pilot owners who wanted to be “at home a minute or two after getting out of their planes.” Two hangar houses were built at the airport as well as a prototype hangar-house to serve as an example for the "airborne community of the future." Frank De Amaral did all the grading work at the airport. They planted the  landing strip with African Kikuyu grass. Tirey later oiled  of the runway. 

The grand opening of the airport was on December 7, 1941. However, on the same day, Japan attacked Pearl Harbor. All private planes were banned from flying on the west coast. As a result, the airport project was put on hold while Ford joined the Army Air Corps to aid in the US war effort. Following the World War II Ford revived his dream of a residential airpark.

Non pilots bought up many of the Airpark homesites. To suit their tastes, Ford created ranch style house sites of 1-3 acres. He envisioned hillside homes where residents could view incoming planes. Dean Wolter ran a flying club at the airfield with a few members.

During World War II, the airfield served to train pilots and as an alternative landing field for military planes flying out of Watsonville and King city.

Pilot Tommy Matthews built a hangar house, with living quarters above the hangar garage. After the war, the house was turned into a flying school subsidized by the federal government, which lasted until the Del Monte Aviation got underway in Monterey. 

In 1946, Ford and Tirey developed the "Airway Village" that years later was renamed the Carmel Valley Village. It included an Airway Market (now the General Store), a barbershop named the "Clip Joint," and the Grapevine liquor Store. All were in walking distance of the Airpark and decorated to resemble a Mexican village.

In 1949, the  State of California licensed the airport. Ford built a residence near the Carmel Valley Village, where he lived for some time. 

In 1952, Lou Gardner purchased Ford's residence and after building motel rooms around the residence, opened the Blue Sky Lodge in 1953. The lodge is still in operation today. In 1953, Ford retired and Peter Delfino purchased the property for $35,000. Delfino developed the airpark runway and hosted several aviation events. He continued this endeavor into the 1980s.

On November 3, 2000, The California Historical Resources Commission voted to nominate Carmel Valley Vintage Airpark as a State Historic Resource. The Commission found that development of CVVA by Ford in 1941 was "significant" because it represented the first airpark in the United States and in the world. On July 3, 2001, an article appeared in the Los Angeles Times that said: “The nation’s first airpark was built in Carmel Valley. It was started by Ford, a man with a vision that planes would someday be as popular as cars for everyday transportation.”

The vintage airfield was used by the helicopters fighting the 2016 Soberanes Fire.

Shutdown of airport

The Monterey County Board of Supervisors was intent on shutting down the airfield. A handful of Carmel Valley residents aligned themselves toward the same goal. A group of local pilots and residents formed the "Carmel Valley Historic Airpark Society" (CVHAS) in 2000. They set out to fight the closure.

In May 2002, after 53 years of operating the airfield, the Delfino family made a decision to close the airfield for commercial use.

Santa's Fly-in 
The airfield is the site of an annual mid-December Santa's Fly-in event. Santa Claus and Mrs. Claus arrive by helicopter and then lead a parade to the nearby Carmel Valley Youth Center for photos, food and drink, and crafts. The event started in 1959 and December 2019 was the event's 61st year.

Carmel Valley airfield as open space

On September 15, 1953, a committee was organized to form a corporation, named the "Carmel Valley Airpark," to preserve the airport. That effort has continued through the years and on June 15, 2018, a group of concerned residents came together to save the airfield from development. The community group has become a registered California Nonprofit organization and has received federal IRS  tax-exempt status.

Sale and Future Use 

In December 2020, Mary Delifno sold the Carmel Valley Airfield land to a local nursery owner, Griggs Nursery, with plans to use the area not for housing but to grow plants for retail sale.

On March 17, 2022, there was a celebration to dedicate a historic marker to commemorate the Carmel Valley Airfield. The sign was donated by the Carmel Valley Historical Society. The memorial marker is on the Griggs Nursery property, just up from the Carmel Valley Post Office. A supervisorial proclamation was presented by Monterey County 5th District Supervisor Mary Adams. Mary Delifno, whose family owned the airport property for decades, was present at the celebration as well as James Keefe, Carmel Valley Post Office property owner. Also attending were local pilots who used to fly their planes in and out of the airfield, representatives from civic groups, and Carmel Valley Historical Society board members.

Carmel writer Chris Counts noted in a March 25, 2022, article for the Carmel Pine Cone, that "Carmel Valley Airfield was not only an important part of the valley's infrastructure, it's also a colorful part of its history, and to memorialize that, a plaque was dedicated March 17 by Supervisor Mary Adams near the former airport"

See also

 California during World War II
 List of airports in California
 List of airports of Santa Cruz County, California

References

External links 
 

Carmel Valley Historical Society (official site)
Carmel Valley Air Park

Defunct airports in California
Carmel Valley, California
1940s in California